Lorenzo Dowe Aughtman (born January 28, 1961) is a former professional American football defensive tackle in the National Football League for the Dallas Cowboys. He played college football at Auburn University.

Early years
Aughtman attended T. R. Miller High School. He accepted a football scholarship from Auburn University.

He was a linebacker until Pat Dye was hired as the new Auburn head coach in 1981. The coaching staff considered converting him into a nose guard or an offensive guard, until deciding to move him to the defensive line. He became a starter as a sophomore. The next year he made 75 tackles (9 for loss).

In 1983, he was a co-captain, while contributed to the team finishing with an 11–1 record and winning its first Southeastern Conference championship since 1957. He recorded a career-high 85 tackles (third on the team), including 7 for loss. He tied his career-high of 11 tackles against the University of Texas and the University of Maryland. He was a two-time All-SEC selection.

Professional career
Aughtman was selected by the Dallas Cowboys in the eleventh round (304th overall) of the 1984 NFL Draft. He was also selected by the Birmingham Stallions in the 1984 USFL Territorial Draft. Because of injuries to the offensive line, like Blaine Nye, John Fitzgerald, Pat Donovan and Kurt Petersen before him, he was switched to the offensive line to play offensive guard in September. He appeared in 7 games, playing on special teams.

In 1985, he injured his shoulder in training camp and was placed on the injured reserve list. He was waived on August 18, 1986.

References

External links
The Boys of '83: From tragedy to a championship

1961 births
Living people
People from Brewton, Alabama
Players of American football from Alabama
American football defensive tackles
Auburn Tigers football players
Dallas Cowboys players